Sigma Aquarii, Latinized from σ Aquarii, is a double star in the equatorial constellation of Aquarius, positioned about 1.3° to the south of the ecliptic. Due to its proximity to the ecliptic, this star is subject to occultation by the Moon. It has a white hue and is visible to the naked eye with an apparent visual magnitude of 4.81. It is drifting further away with a radial velocity of +11 km/s.

The stellar classification of Sigma Aquarii is A0 IVs, indicating that it is a subgiant star. The s qualifier means that its absorption lines are sharp (narrow) in comparison with standard stars, caused by a relatively slow rotation.  It has been categorized as a hot Am star, meaning that it is a chemically peculiar, although this is now considered doubtful. The spectrum displays at least double the normal abundances of elements like magnesium, aluminum and silicon, while helium and scandium are under-abundant. Calcium, normally deficient in Am stars, has near-normal abundance.

The Hipparcos catalogue identified Sigma Aquarii as a possible astrometric binary with an orbital period of 654 days.

References

External links
 Image Sigma Aquarii

A-type subgiants
Am stars
Astrometric binaries
Aquarius (constellation)
Aquarii, Sigma
Durchmusterung objects
213320
111123
Aquarii, 057
8573